Innocent Gentillet (1535–1588) was a French lawyer and politician.

A Huguenot moderate lawyer and parliamentarian, he was exiled to Geneva after the massacre of St. Bartholomew, and then returned to France after the Edict of Beaulieu in 1576. His Protestant views are the cause of a new exile to Geneva in 1585, where he died in 1588.

He wrote and published in 1576 the Discours sur les moyens de bien gouverner (Sermon on the means of governing), in which he condemned the ideas of Niccolò Machiavelli, suspected of trying to introduce impiety and immorality in government. He also accused the Italians of the entourage of Catherine de' Medici to make the propagators. The book, translated and published in Latin in 1577, then in English, has considerable diffusion throughout Europe until the mid-seventeenth century. It was known as the Anti-Machiavel and was the first source of the concept machiavellism. Gentillet argues that the source of wealth of a state is its large population. He believes that the infighting and bad laws are contrary to the development of population and condemned luxury as detrimental to national welfare. He also announced political science as defined by Jean Bodin.

References

1535 births
1588 deaths
French Calvinist and Reformed Christians
French non-fiction writers
Politicians from the Republic of Geneva